Trevor John Watts (born 30 January 1968) is an Australian Liberal National politician who is the member of the Legislative Assembly of Queensland for Toowoomba North, having defeated Kerry Shine at the 2012 state election.

Watts was born in Essex, England and was raised in and around London. At the age of 17, he moved to Hong Kong to play basketball for South China AA. He visited Queensland in 1988, to attend World Expo 88 in Brisbane, and decided to move there permanently.

Watts was elected to Queensland Parliament as the Member for Toowoomba North in 2012, and was re-elected in 2015 and 2017. He currently serves as a Member of the Economics and Governance Committee. Prior to that, Watts' Parliamentary service included being a member of the Legal Affairs and Community Safety Committee, Parliamentary Crime and Corruption Committee and the Ethics Committee, chair of the Parliamentary Crime and Corruption Committee, Chief Opposition Whip, Shadow Minister for Police and Counter Terrorism and Shadow Minister for Corrective Services.

Watts resigned his position as Shadow Minister for Police and Counter Terrorism, and Shadow Minister for Corrective Services in April 2020 following public revelations he attended a social event that contravened Queensland's COVID-19 health regulations. He was fined $1,300 by Queensland Police.

References

1968 births
Living people
Liberal National Party of Queensland politicians
Members of the Queensland Legislative Assembly
University of Southern Queensland alumni
South China AA basketball players
English emigrants to Australia
British expatriates in Hong Kong
21st-century Australian politicians